Anathallis deborana is a species of orchid plant native to Venezuela.

References 

deborana
Flora of Venezuela